Ryoto Higa (比嘉 諒人, born 17 October 1990) is a Japanese football player who last played for Blaublitz Akita.

Club statistics
Updated to 23 February 2018.

Honours
 Blaublitz Akita
 J3 League (1): 2017

References

External links

Profile at Blaublitz Akita

1990 births
Living people
Niigata University of Health and Welfare alumni
Association football people from Gifu Prefecture
Japanese footballers
J2 League players
J3 League players
FC Gifu players
Blaublitz Akita players
Association football midfielders